Michael John Borkowski (born May 6, 1973) is an American race car driver. Borkowski has raced in a variety of cars and series, is experienced in both road and oval racing, but is best known for his victory over Tommy Kendall in the 1997 Trans-Am Series race at Pikes Peak International Raceway, ending Kendall's historic run of 11 consecutive race wins. Borkowski also went on to win the final race of the 1997 Trans-Am Series at the Reno Grand Prix.

Early career

Borkowski grew up in the small town of Middlebury, Connecticut and began racing Quarter Midgets at the Silver City Quarter Midget Club in Meriden, Connecticut - the same club as race car drivers Jeff Simmons, Erin Crocker, Joey Logano, and renowned Indycar engineer Chris Simmons. Borkowski competed in Quarter Midgets from 1981 to 1988, winning four New England States Championships in the process.

At age 16, Borkowski made the transition to full size cars competing in the 1989 Spenard David School and 1990 Bertil Roos School Racing Series, winning three out of seven races, two pole positions, and finishing on the podium five times. In 1990 he also competed in the SCCA's New England States Road Racing and North Atlantic Road Racing Championships, dominating both Championships with seven wins, two track records, seven pole positions, and eight fastest race laps.

Still a senior in high school at the Taft School in Watertown, Connecticut, Borkowski turned pro in 1991, competing in SCCA's Pro Sports 2000 Series, winning Rookie of the Year. Borkowski continued his winning ways in the 1992 and 1993 Pro Sports 2000 Championships, capturing five wins, eleven podiums, nine track records, four pole positions along with the 1993 Series Championship.

In 1992, Borkowski had a unique opportunity to co-pilot the Oldsmobile Aerotech in a grueling test of endurance and speed at the Firestone Test Track in Fort Stockton, Texas, setting multiple FIA World Speed Records in the process.

1994 saw the transition for Borkowski to open-wheel race cars. He was awarded the Team USA Scholarship to compete at the legendary British Formula Ford Festival at Brands Hatch. In 1994 he also competed in and won the SCCA Pro Formula 2000 Championship, winning four of six races entered in a seven race series, four pole positions, finishing on the podium in all six starts, and setting six track records.

Indy Lights, Indycar, and Sportscars

In 1995 Mike ran a limited schedule in Indy Lights with Team Medlin, competing and finishing in the top ten in all six races run with a best finish of fourth at Belle Isle Park in Detroit.

In 1996 Borkowski was tapped to run his first 24 Hours of Daytona as factory driver for the #1 Oldsmobile Aurora GTS-1 alongside drivers Irv Hoerr, Brian Cunningham, and Darin Brassfield. The team was leading in class when the car caught fire at the 9 hour mark, preventing the car and team from finishing the race. In 1996, Borkowski was also selected for the inaugural Team Green Academy, however, was unable to participate due to being signed by Team Rahal Letterman.

1997 was a breakout year for Borkowski's professional career, competing for Team Rahal Letterman in partnership with Tom Gloy Racing in the Trans-Am Series, collecting the two aforementioned wins, third in the overall championship, and Rookie of the Year honors.

In 1998 Borkowski returned to Indy Lights under the Team Rahal Letterman banner but with limited success, collecting only one top five finish at Vancouver in fourteen starts. In 1998, Borkowski also ran his second 24 Hours of Daytona, campaigning a Tom Gloy fielded GT1 Ford Mustang Cobra alongside drivers Tony Kanaan and Robbie Buhl, finishing third in class.

In 1999, Borkowski qualified and raced in one Indy Racing League event at the Charlotte Motor Speedway, however the race was stopped prior to completion after crash debris entered the grandstands killing three spectators. Borkowski also made his one and only attempt at qualifying for the Indy 500 driving for PDM Racing but never got his chance when rain cut short qualifying on Bubble Day.

Later in his career, Borkowski returned full-time to driving sports GT and prototype race cars in the Rolex Sports Car Series. In 2003, he was hired by legendary Brumos Racing to campaign a Porsche powered Daytona Prototype alongside David Donohue in the inaugural season for the Rolex Series and Daytona Prototype class. Together Borkowski and Donohue won three races, stood on the podium ten times, and finished second overall in the series championship. Between 2003 and 2010, Borkowski competed in both the Rolex Series' Daytona Prototype and GT classes for various teams including Speedsource, Michael Shank Racing, Playboy Racing, and Stevenson Motorsports. During this period he drove a variety of cars with a variety of co-drivers including Daytona Prototype's (with Paul Tracy, Kenny Wilden, and Brian Friselle), a Nissan 350Z and BMW M6 (with Tommy Constantine), and a Chevrolet Camaro GT.R (with Matt Bell).

In 2004, Borkowski also piloted a Lola Nissan LMP2 prototype in the 12 Hours of Sebring with co-drivers Ian James and John Macaluso, winning their class.

NASCAR

Borkowski had a limited NASCAR career, competing in one Winston West Series, one Busch North Series, one Craftsman Truck Series, and nine Busch Series events between 1999 and 2003. His best finish was a tenth at Talladega Superspeedway in 2000 driving for the now defunct Bill Davis Racing. After causing four crashes in one race, Borkowski was fired. First crashing Lyndon Amick who faked him out on throwing his helmet, then crashing Jason Jarrett who then threw his knee pads at Borkowski's car under caution. Then with 9 laps to go, he crashed Ted Christopher and Tony Raines in one crash and Jay Sauter and Michael Ritch on the last lap at the Busch 200 at New Hampshire Motor Speedway, on the same weekend that Adam Petty was killed in a crash. Bill Davis Racing released him after this event due to pressure from his sponsor. Borkowski was then sued by title sponsor AT&T for "allegedly tarnishing their brand image".

Motorsports career results

SCCA National Championship Runoffs

IndyCar Series

(key) (Races in bold indicate pole position)

 1 Borkowski qualified 24th for the 1999 VisionAire 500K at Charlotte, however, the race was cancelled after 79 laps due to spectator fatalities. The race was subsequently stricken from record.

Indy 500 results

 1 On Bubble Day, Borkowski was in line to qualify Tony Stewart's backup car but never got the chance due to rain washing out the final minutes of qualifying.

NASCAR
(key) (Bold – Pole position awarded by qualifying time. Italics – Pole position earned by points standings or practice time. * – Most laps led.)

Winston Cup Series

Busch Series

Craftsman Truck Series

ARCA Bondo/Mar-Hyde Series
(key) (Bold – Pole position awarded by qualifying time. Italics – Pole position earned by points standings or practice time. * – Most laps led.)

References

See: DRIVER-CAR, P. S., PTSTBMPM LR, and TRABBRVI RA. "Drivers’ Championship Point Standings."

External links

Mike Borkowski at ChampCarStats.com
Mike Borkowski at Driver Database

1973 births
24 Hours of Daytona drivers
Rolex Sports Car Series drivers
Indy Lights drivers
IndyCar Series drivers
NASCAR drivers
People from Middlebury, Connecticut
Racing drivers from Connecticut
Trans-Am Series drivers
Living people
SCCA National Championship Runoffs participants
U.S. F2000 National Championship drivers
Sportspeople from the Bronx
Racing drivers from New York City
Cornell University alumni
ARCA Menards Series drivers
PDM Racing drivers
Rahal Letterman Lanigan Racing drivers